Nick Polano (March 25, 1941 – September 26, 2019) was a Canadian ice hockey player, coach, and scout. Polano was the Detroit Red Wings' head coach when owner Mike Ilitch first bought the team in 1982, and later served as the team's assistant general manager. As head coach, his overall record in the NHL was 79–127–34.

Playing career
Polano was born in Sudbury, Ontario and grew up in Copper Cliff. He never played in the National Hockey League, but he did play 15 seasons in the American Hockey League (AHL), plus 17 games in the World Hockey Association (WHA) as a defenceman.

Coaching career
Polano began his coaching career in 1975–76 with the Erie Blades of the North American Hockey League (NAHL) and led that team to three consecutive regular season and playoff championships. Staying with the Blades as they changed leagues, Polano was twice named Eastern Hockey League coach of the year and in 1981 was named minor league executive of the year by The Sporting News.

Detroit Red Wings
Polano spent ten seasons in the Detroit Red Wings organization, first as head coach and then as assistant general manager. Polano guided the Red Wings from 1982 to 1985 and amassed a 79–127–34 regular season record as their head coach. In the summer of 1985, Polano was replaced as head coach by Harry Neale, but remained in the organization as the assistant general manager for player development. The move had been planned by Red Wings general manager Jim Devellano several years prior. Polano and team vice president Jim Lites, along with several European scouts, were instrumental in aiding the defection of several future NHL players from behind the Iron Curtain including Petr Klima, Slava Kozlov, and Sergei Fedorov.

Polano had scouted Klima during the 1983 World Championships where he was competing as a member of Czechoslovakia men's national ice hockey team. Based on Polano's recommendation, the Red Wings drafted Klima in the fifth round (88th overall) of the 1983 NHL Entry Draft. In the summer of 1985, Klima left his team during a team meal in Nußdorf am Inn, West Germany, to meet Lites and Polano at an undisclosed location. Several days were then spent in the effort to bring Klíma to North America as Lites and Polano kept Klíma under wraps in Nußdorf and other locations to avoid pursuit by Czech police. Polano stayed with Klíma as Lites and other Wings officials arranged for him to gain refugee status to enter the United States. While they were waiting, Polano trained Klima in the woods outside of town. The Red Wings were assisted by U.S. attorney general Edwin Meese and deputy attorney general Lowell Jensen in expediting the political-asylum process. Polano accompanied Klima to the United States, where they arrived at Detroit Metro Airport on September 22, 1985.

Before joining Detroit, Polano served as an assistant coach with the Buffalo Sabres for one season under Scotty Bowman in 1981–82.

Calgary Flames
From 1992 to 2000 Polano worked for the Calgary Flames, first as their director of pro scouting and later as their director of player personnel and general manager and alternate governor for the Saint John Flames.

Ottawa Senators
In August 2002, Polano joined the Ottawa Senators as part-time professional scout.

Death
Polano died from Alzheimer's disease at age 78; he was diagnosed four years before his death.

NHL coaching record

References

External links

1941 births
2019 deaths
Albuquerque Six-Guns players
Amarillo Wranglers players
Baltimore Clippers players
Buffalo Sabres coaches
Calgary Flames executives
Calgary Flames scouts
Canadian ice hockey coaches
Canadian ice hockey defencemen
Deaths from Alzheimer's disease
Detroit Red Wings coaches
Edmonton Flyers (WHL) players
Hamilton Tiger Cubs players
Hershey Bears players
Ice hockey people from Ontario
Louisville Rebels players
North American Hockey League (1973–1977) coaches
Omaha Knights (CHL) players
Omaha Knights (IHL) players
Ottawa Senators scouts
Philadelphia Blazers players
Providence Reds players
Sportspeople from Greater Sudbury
Neurological disease deaths in Canada